Bernard B. Hughes (January 9, 1910 – December 1967) was a former American football offensive lineman in the National Football League for the Boston Braves and Chicago Cardinals.  He played college football at the University of Oregon.

1910 births
1967 deaths
Players of American football from California
American football offensive guards
American football centers
Boston Braves (NFL) players
Chicago Cardinals players
People from Siskiyou County, California